Mordellistena paraepisternalis is a species of beetle in the genus Mordellistena of the family Mordellidae. It was described by Ermisch in 1965 and can be found in countries such as Greece, Bulgaria and Spain.

References

Beetles described in 1965
paraepisternalis
Beetles of Asia
Beetles of Europe
Endemic fauna of Turkey